The Catharpin Creek Formation is a Late Triassic (late Norian to Rhaetian) geologic formation in Maryland and Virginia. It is found along the western edge of the Culpeper Basin, one of the largest sedimentary basins in the Newark Supergroup. Compared to the underlying Bull Run Formation, the Catharpin Creek Formation is dominated by much coarser sedimentary rocks such as sandstone and conglomerate. The base of the formation is reddish arkosic sandstone, which grades into drabber thin-bedded siltstone and shale in cyclical sequences.

The general depositional environment is reconstructed as a system of active streams running down from alluvial fans which developed along highlands further west of the basin. A few outcrops contain lenses of a conglomerate unit known as the Goose Creek Member. This unit preserves a diverse array of reddish brown to grayish green pebbles and cobbles derived from metamorphic rocks, alongside some sandstone and sandy siltstone. The pebbles and cobbles would have originated from the Proterozoic and Cambrian Catoctin Formation and Chilhowee Group exposed along the Blue Ridge Mountains.

The Catharpin Creek Formation is the youngest fully Triassic unit in the Culpeper Basin, before the occurrence of Triassic-Jurassic basalts associated with eruptions of the Central Atlantic Magmatic Province (CAMP). Based on general stratigraphic characteristics, it is typically considered to be equivalent to the Passaic Formation of the Newark Basin. The estimated age of the Catharpin Creek Formation is late Norian to Rhaetian according to fossils of conchostracans such as Shipingia olseni and Euestheria brodieana.

References 

Geologic formations of Maryland
Geologic formations of Virginia
Triassic System of North America
Triassic geology of Virginia
Norian Stage
Sandstone formations
Conglomerate formations
Shale formations
Siltstone formations
Alluvial deposits
Ichnofossiliferous formations
Paleontology in Virginia